Iván Tibor Berend (commonly known as Iván T. Berend; born 11 December 1930) is a Hungarian historian and teacher who served as President of the Hungarian Academy of Sciences from 1985 until 1990. He was a member of Hungarian Socialist Workers' Party's Central Committee between 1988 and 1989. Since 1990 he has been living in Los Angeles and teaching at UCLA. In 2015, he was elected to the American Academy of Arts and Sciences.

Publications
With György Ránki:

Magyarország gyáripara 1900–1914 (1955)
Magyarország gyáripara a második világháború előtt és a háború időszakában 1933–1944 (1958)
Magyarország a fasiszta Németország „életterében” 1933–1939 (1960)
Közép-Kelet-Európa gazdasági fejlődése a 19–20. században (1966)
A magyar gazdaság száz éve 1848–1944 (1973)
Gazdaság és társadalom (1974)
Gazdasági elmaradottság, kiutak és kudarcok a 19. századi Európában (1979)
Európa gazdasága 1780–1914 (1987)

Major works:

Újjáépítés és a nagytőke elleni harc Magyarországon 1945–1949 (1962)
A szocialista gazdaság fejlődése Magyarországon (1974)
Napjaink – a történelemben (1980)
Válságok évtizedek (1982)
Gazdasági útkeresés (1983)
A magyar gazdasági reform útja (1988)
Transition to a Market Economy at The End of the 20th Century (szerk., 1994)
Central and Eastern Europe 1944–1993: Detour from the Periphery to the Periphery (1996, in Hungarian with the title of Terelőúton, 1999)
A történelem – ahogy megéltem (1997)
Decades of Crisis: Central and Eastern Europe Before World War II. (1998)
History Derailed: Central and Eastern Europe in the Long 19th Century (2003, in Hungarian with the title of Kisiklott történelem)
An Economic History of 20th Century Europe (2006, in Hungarian with the title of Európa gazdasága a 20. században, 2008)
From the Soviet Bloc to the European Union: The Economic and Social Transformation of Central and Eastern Europe Since 1973 (2009)
History in My Life: A Memoir in Three Eras (2009)
Europe in Crisis – Bolt from the blue? (2013)

References

External links
MTI Ki Kicsoda 2009, Magyar Távirati Iroda Zrt., Budapest, 2008, 105. old., 
Adatlap a Magyar Tudományos Akadémia honlapján
Önéletrajz a Mindentudás Egyeteme honlapján
Szakmai életrajz a UCLA honlapján (in English)

1930 births
Living people
Writers from Budapest
Hungarian Jews
Members of the Hungarian Socialist Workers' Party
20th-century Hungarian historians
Historians of Hungary
Members of the Hungarian Academy of Sciences
Members of the Austrian Academy of Sciences
Historians of European integration

Holocaust survivors
University of California, Los Angeles faculty